The 1934 Open Championship was the 69th Open Championship, held 27–29 June at Royal St George's Golf Club in Sandwich, England. Henry Cotton dominated the championship, leading wire-to-wire on his way to a five-stroke win and his first of three Open titles.

Qualifying took place on 25–26 June, Monday and Tuesday, with 18 holes at St. George's and 18 holes at Royal Cinque Ports, and the top 100 and ties qualified. George Gadd led the qualifiers on 140; Cotton scored a course record 66 in the first round at Royal St George's and 75 at Royal Cinque Ports to be a shot behind on 141. He was joined on 141 by Jimmy Adams and Percy Alliss. The qualifying score was 152 and 101 players advanced.

Cotton opened with 67 on Wednesday to take a three-shot lead over Fred Taggart. Cotton then shot an Open-record 65 in the second round to open up a nine-shot lead over Alf Padgham, while two strokes further back in third were Joe Kirkwood, Denny Shute, and Charles Whitcombe. The top 60 and ties would make the cut and qualify for the final 36 holes; it was at 153 (and better) and 69 advanced.

Conditions were tougher on Friday with a stiff breeze blowing. Cotton scored a third round of 72 in the morning and extended his lead to ten shots over Kirkwood. Scottish amateur Jack McLean had seven threes in his outward nine of 31 and finished with a third round 69, the best third round score. Despite his comfortable lead, Cotton suffered from nerves and began to feel the pressure in the final round that afternoon. He made the turn in 40, then dropped three shots on the next three holes. With Sid Brews scoring 71, Cotton needed a last round of 83 to win. Suddenly it appeared as if his victory was in jeopardy. He managed to get up-and-down on the 13th and steadied himself on his way to a 79 and 283, five strokes ahead of runner-up Brews. His total tied the championship record set by Gene Sarazen two years earlier.

Cotton was the first resident Briton to win the Open Championship since Arthur Havers in 1923. The previous ten had been won by American-born players or residents (Englishman Jim Barnes (1925)). Cotton's win was part of a long period of sustained excellence in the tournament. From 1930 through 1952, he finished in the top-10 in all but one of the Opens he played in. In all, he played in twenty Opens between 1927 and 1958, winning three and finishing in the top-10 in seventeen.

Cotton received the Ryle Memorial Medal, awarded to members of the British P.G.A. winning the Open Championship. He was the first recipient since Arthur Havers in 1923. Living in Belgium, Cotton was not eligible for the Tooting Bec Cup awarded to the British P.G.A. member living in Great Britain scoring the lowest round in the Open Championship. It was won by Bill Davies for his second round of 68.

Past champions in the field 

Source:

All past champions in the field made the cut.

Did not advance past qualifying rounds (Monday & Tuesday):
Arthur Havers (1923) 157, James Braid (1901, 1905, 1906, 1908, 1910) 157,George Duncan (1920) 160, Ted Ray (1912) 161, Sandy Herd (1902) 161.

Did not enter:
Tommy Armour (1931), Bobby Jones (1926, 1927, 1930), Walter Hagen (1922, 1924, 1928, 1929),Jim Barnes (1925), Jock Hutchison (1921).

Round summaries

First round
Wednesday, 27 June 1934

Source:

Second round
Thursday, 28 June 1934

Source:

Third round
Friday, 29 June 1934 (morning)

Source:

Final round
Friday, 29 June 1934 (afternoon)

Source:

Amateurs: McLean (300), Thompson (307), Flaherty (308), Hartley (308),Garnett (311), Storey (311), Ricardo (313).

References

External links
Royal St George's 1934 (Official site)

The Open Championship
Golf tournaments in England
Open Championship
Open Championship
Open Championship